Lukas Ligeti (born in Vienna, Austria, 13 June 1965) is an Austrian-American composer and percussionist. His work incorporates elements of jazz, contemporary classical and various world musics, especially African traditional and popular music styles.

Biography
Ligeti is of Hungarian ancestry and is the son of the noted composer György Ligeti (1923–2006). He holds a master's degree from the University of Music and Performing Arts, Vienna, where he studied composition with Erich Urbanner and jazz drums, and a PhD from the University of Witwatersrand in Johannesburg, South Africa.

Ligeti has done numerous cross-cultural collaborations and exchanges with non-Western musicians, experimenting with both ancient African traditional instruments and modern music technology.

He travels frequently to Africa and has performed with musicians from Côte d'Ivoire (where he founded the experimental intercultural group Beta Foly), Egypt (with musicians from Nubia and the Orchestra of the Cairo Opera House), Zimbabwe (with Batonka musicians), Uganda (with Ndere Troupe), Kenya, South Africa, Lesotho (with lesiba performers), Mozambique and several other African nations.

His group, Burkina Electric, based in Burkina Faso, brings together electronica and Burkinabe popular music.

From 1994 to 1996 he was visiting composer at the Center for Computer Research in Music and Acoustics at Stanford University.

In 2006 he was visiting professor at the University of the Witwatersrand, Johannesburg. In 2008 he was a guest professor at the University of Ghana, where he collaborated with composer and musicologist J.H. Kwabena Nketia.

He resided in Southern California and was on faculty at the Department of Music at the University of California, Irvine, where he taught in the PhD program in Integrated Composition, Improvisation, and Technology (ICIT) until 2021. He currently teaches at the University of Pretoria in South Africa.

Works
Ligeti creates music ranging from the through-composed to the free-improvised, often exploring polyrhythmic/polytempo structures, non-tempered tunings, and non-Western elements.

Compositions have been commissioned and/or performed at concerts and festival worldwide by the London Sinfonietta, the Amadinda Ensemble Budapest, Icebreaker, the London Composers' Ensemble, the Synergy Percussion Sydney, the Ensemble Modern, Kronos Quartet, Vienna Radio Symphony Orchestra, Bang on a Can, San Francisco Contemporary Music Players, Orchestre National de Lyon, Eighth Blackbird, American Composers Orchestra, MDR Orchestra Germany, Budapest Festival Orchestra, Håkan Hardenberger, Colin Currie, New York University, Subtropics Festival/Historical Museum of Southern Florida, Vienna Festwochen, Radio France, Tonkünstler Orchestra, Royal Liverpool Philharmonic´s Ensemble 10/10, Present Music, Ensemble Mise-En, Contemporaneous, Ensemble “die reihe”, Third Coast, Kroumata Percussion Groups, and a consortium that includes marimbists such as Eric Beach (So Percussion) and Ji Hye Jung, among others.

He has also composed for dance, film and gallery settings. He has collaborated with choreographers such as Karole Armitage and Panaibra Gabriel Canda, among others.

He has composed music for the European channel ARTE TV, and created a sound installation for Goethe Institut on the occasion of the FIFA World Cup 2014 in Brazil.

He has collaborated with Lebanese sound artist Tarek Atoui, and has been resident artist at the Museum of the History of Polish Jews in Warsaw, where he created a site-specific performance.

As an improvisor, he has played with John Zorn, Henry Kaiser, Kurt Dahlke (aka Pyrolator), Raoul Björkenheim, Elliott Sharp, John Tchicai, Ned Rothenberg, David Rothenberg, Marilyn Crispell, Michael Manring, Benoît Delbecq, Gianni Gebbia, Mari Kimura, George Lewis, Gary Lucas, Wadada Leo Smith, DJ Spooky, Thollem McDonas, Jon Rose, Jim O´Rourke, members of Sonic Youth and The Grateful Dead, and many others.

He leads or co-leads bands such as Hypercolor (with Eyal Maoz and James Ilgenfritz), Notebook and Burkina Electric.  

He frequently performs solo on electronic percussion, especially with the Marimba Lumina, an instrument designed  by renowned synthesizer engineer Don Buchla. He is one of the very few musicians performing on this instrument.

CDs of his music have been released by Tzadik, Cantaloupe, Intuition, Innova, Leo, among other record labels, and he is endorsed by the drum sticks brand Vic Firth.

Recognitions and Awards
Ligeti was recipient of the CalArts Herb Alpert Arts Award in the Music category in 2010.

Ligeti is a two-time recipient of the New York Foundation for the Arts Composition Fellowship (2002, 2008), of the Austrian State Grant for Composition (1991, 1996), and was awarded the “Förderungspreis” of the City of Vienna in 1990, a 1993 award of the Republic of Austria and composition fellowships and grants by the Arts Council of Santa Clara County/California and the Austrian state.

In 2013 and 2015–19, he has been listed as a “Rising Star” percussionist in the Critics’ Poll of the leading jazz magazine DownBeat; he was also the winner of the NYC-based “UnCaged Toy Piano” composition competition in 2013.

Residencies have included Villa Montalvo (Saratoga, CA), the Emily Harvey Foundation (Venice, Italy), Acéfalo Festival (Santiago, Chile) and Sonoscopia (Porto, Portugal).

Discography (selected)

 1991: Things Of Now Now – Nownowism     
 1993: Kombinat M – Hybrid Beat 
 1997: Lukas Ligeti & Beta Foly – Lukas Ligeti & Beta Foly 
 2003: Raoul Björkenheim & Lukas Ligeti – Shadowglow 
 2004: Lukas Ligeti – Mystery System  
 2008: Lukas Ligeti – Afrikan Machinery 
 2010: Burkina Electric – Paspanga
 2011: Lukas Ligeti, Benoît Delbecq, Gianni Gebbia, Aly Keita & Michael Manring – Pattern Time 
 2014: Lukas Ligeti & Thollem McDonas – Imaginary Images 
 2015: Hypercolor – Hypercolor
 2021: Lukas Ligeti - That Which Has Remained... That Which Will Emerge...

References

External links
Lukas Ligeti´s Official Site
Lukas Ligeti's Facebook Page
Music Information Centre Austria on Ligeti
Surround Sound DVD

1965 births
Living people
21st-century classical composers
Austrian classical composers
Austrian classical musicians
Austrian drummers
Male drummers
Austrian Jews
Austrian people of Romanian-Jewish descent
Hungarian classical composers
Hungarian male classical composers
Austrian male classical composers
Hungarian Jews
Musicians from New York City
Musicians from Vienna
Tzadik Records artists
21st-century American drummers
21st-century American male musicians